Sorana Prelipceanu (born 28 May 1958) is a Romanian diver. She competed in the women's 3 metre springboard event at the 1972 Summer Olympics.

References

1958 births
Living people
Romanian female divers
Olympic divers of Romania
Divers at the 1972 Summer Olympics
Sportspeople from Cluj-Napoca